Salix rupifraga is a species of willow native to mountains of Honshū, Japan. It is a deciduous shrub.

References 

rupifraga